Susanne Moll (born 27 July 1987) is an Austrian snowboarder. She has represented Austria at the 2014 Winter Olympics in Sochi.

References

1987 births
Snowboarders at the 2014 Winter Olympics
Living people
Olympic snowboarders of Austria
Austrian female snowboarders